Urbano Ortega Cuadros (born 22 December 1961), known simply as Urbano, is a Spanish former footballer who played as a midfielder.

Over the course of 16 La Liga seasons (18 for his career), he amassed totals of 301 games and 16 goals, mainly for Espanyol and Barcelona.

Club career
Urbano was born in Beas de Segura, Province of Jaén. After starting out at Real Jaén and RCD Español, he signed with Catalonia neighbours FC Barcelona in 1982. He only started in two of his nine seasons during his Camp Nou spell, being mainly used as a backup.

Subsequently, Urbano returned to Español for two more seasons, with top-flight relegation in 1992–93. He closed out his professional career in 1996, after playing with modest UE Lleida (one year) and CP Mérida (two), with two additional campaigns in the top division, one with each team.

Urbano began coaching in 2003, assisting former Barça teammate Esteban Vigo at numerous clubs, including Romania's FC Dinamo București. His first head coach experience arrived in 2007–08 in Segunda División B, with CD Baza. He resigned in June 2008, as the side dropped down a tier.

After working as a scout for Barcelona and Villarreal CF, Urbano returned to another former club, Espanyol (as they were now known), in July 2009, as a sporting director.

International career
Urbano never earned a senior cap for Spain, but was a regular for its under-21 team, also competing at the 1980 Summer Olympics.

Honours
Barcelona
La Liga: 1990–91
Copa del Rey: 1982–83, 1987–88, 1989–90
Supercopa de España: 1983
Copa de la Liga: 1986
UEFA Cup Winners' Cup: 1988–89

References

External links

1961 births
Living people
Sportspeople from the Province of Jaén (Spain)
Spanish footballers
Footballers from Andalusia
Association football midfielders
La Liga players
Segunda División players
Segunda División B players
Real Jaén footballers
RCD Espanyol footballers
FC Barcelona players
UE Lleida players
CP Mérida footballers
Málaga CF players
Spain youth international footballers
Spain under-21 international footballers
Spain under-23 international footballers
Spain amateur international footballers
Olympic footballers of Spain
Footballers at the 1980 Summer Olympics
Spanish football managers
Segunda División B managers
FC Barcelona non-playing staff
Villarreal CF non-playing staff
Spanish expatriate sportspeople in Romania